Kemper Winsborough Yancey (June 2, 1887 – February 17, 1957) was an American football player and coach. He served as head football coach at Hampden–Sydney College in 1910 and at the University of Virginia in 1911, compiling a career college football record of 12–5.  Yancey was born on June 2, 1887, in Harrisonburg, Virginia. He later worked for the United States Department of Labor. He died on February 17, 1957, in Richmond, Virginia.

Head coaching record

References

External links
 

1887 births
1957 deaths
American football fullbacks
Hampden–Sydney Tigers football coaches
Virginia Cavaliers football coaches
Virginia Cavaliers football players
All-Southern college football players
People from Harrisonburg, Virginia